Critical Mass was a Dutch happy hardcore act that was active from 1994 till 1999 during the happy hardcore period. They scored several hits in the Netherlands. Members of the group were producer Huib Schippers, Dave van Hasselaar and Ed Bout. Later, female singer Ludmilla Odijk and rapper Danny Haenraets aka MC Energie joined the group.

Biography 
In 1994 producer Ed Bout came in contact with producer Dave van Hasselaar. Together they decided to form a new group. This duo received a request from hardcore/gabber-organisation ID&T records, to produce some radio-friendly hardcore. With the song "Dancing Together" Critical Mass scored a hit. That same year Critical Mass were given a face by female singer Ludmilla Odijk and rapper MC Energie.

In 1996 the band had a few hits with singles like "Burnin' Love", "Believe In The Future" and "Happy Generation". Later that year ID&T announced that Critical Mass would be combined with 2 Unlimited. In 1997, when happy hardcore became less popular in the Netherlands, the single "Together In Dreams" was produced. This single was a lot less successful than expected. Bout and Van Hasselaar decided to change their career by trying different styles of music. In 1999 their last single came out, called "In Your Eyes".

In 2008, the group came back together, with their original line-up, to perform on different happy hardcore parties.

Discography 

|- align=center
|align=left|Psychotic Break|||1994|||||||||Label: Rough Trade
|- align=center
|align=left|Burnin' Love|||1995|||||||||
|- align=center
|align=left|Dancing Together|||1995||26-8-1995||37||||
|- align=center
|align=left|Burnin' Love|||1996||20-1-1996||9||10||Re-release
|- align=center
|align=left|Believe In The Future|||1996||15-6-1996||10||7||
|- align=center
|align=left|Happy Generation|||1996||28-12-1996||23||6||
|- align=center
|align=left|Together In Dreams|||1997|||||||||
|- align=center
|align=left|In Your Eyes|||1999|||||||||Label: BYTE
|- align=center
|}

References

Happy hardcore musicians
Dutch dance music groups
Musical groups established in 1994
Musical groups disestablished in 1999